Georges Detreille (9 September 1893 – 13 May 1957) was a French cyclist who competed in the road race at the 1920 Summer Olympics. He finished sixth individually and won a gold medal as member of the French time trial team. In 1921 he turned professional and rode the 1926 Tour de France.

References

External links

Georges Detreille's profile at databaseOlympics

1893 births
1957 deaths
French male cyclists
Olympic cyclists of France
Cyclists at the 1920 Summer Olympics
Olympic gold medalists for France
Olympic medalists in cycling
Medalists at the 1920 Summer Olympics
Sportspeople from Bourg-en-Bresse
Cyclists from Auvergne-Rhône-Alpes